Can We Fall in Love is the ninth studio album by American singer Avant. It was released by SoNo Recording Group and Mo-B Entertainment on July 10, 2020 in the United States. and includes the Top 30 Urban AC hit "Not Gone Lose."

Singles
The lead single "Not Gone Lose" premiered in February 2019 and released to streaming services on March 8, 2019. It peaked at number 23 on Billboards Adult R&B Songs chart in April 2019. The follow-up single "Edible" premiered in June 2020, ahead of the album's announcement. The third and final single was the title track which was released on October 29, 2020.

Accolades
Can We Fall in Love received a nomination at the UB Honors 2020 for Best Independent R&B Release.

Remix EPs
Avant did a collaboration in 2021 with Terry Hunter and released three remix EPs for the album tracks "Can We Fall in Love", "Take It Slow" and "Nothing Without You".

Track listing
All tracks produced by Avant and Travis Sayles.

Release history

References

2020 albums
Avant albums